Tabulaephorus afghanus is a moth of the family Pterophoridae. It was described by Ernst Arenberger in 1981 and is found in Afghanistan.

The wingspan is 25–27 mm. The forewings are brown, while the hindwings, abdomen, antennae and legs are light brown.

References

Moths described in 1981
Pterophorini